Legionella monrovica is a Gram-negative bacterium from the genus Legionella.

References 

Legionellales